StarTimes GO is an African integrated e-shopping platform created by the media group StarTimes.

StarTimes GO operates three retail models (TV shopping, Online shopping and Phone-call shopping) that are integrated into a single platform.

History 
StarTimes GO was launched during the COVID-19 pandemic in Uganda and Kenya as a home shopping service combining a television show, an online shopping platform and a call center service to offer StarTimes subscribers a safe way to do their shopping without having to leave their home. 

Quickly, StarTimes GO expanded to neighboring countries and by September 2020 the service was available in 11 sub-Saharan African countries (Uganda, Kenya, South Africa, Zambia, Tanzania, Nigeria, Rwanda Mozambique, Ghana, Côte d'Ivoire and Democratic Republic of the Congo).

On 1st September 2020, StarTimes officially launched the StarTimes GO TV channel as a free-to-air shopping channel in Uganda, Kenya and Nigeria.

Products 
The platform currently sells electronic products as well as daily commodities.

Services 
Products are introduced through the TV shows and can be ordered through StarTimes online platform and call center. The products are delivered directly to the consumer.

StarTimes GO channel availability

References

External links 

 www.startimestv.com
Nigeria Facebook page: https://www.facebook.com/StarTimesGO
Kenya Facebook page: https://www.facebook.com/StarTimesGOKenya

Shopping networks
Online marketplaces of Nigeria
Online marketplaces of Kenya